Blackie Ko (February 22, 1953 – December 9, 2003) was a  Taiwanese film director, producer, stuntman, singer and actor. Blackie was considered to be the greatest automotive stunt choreographer in Asia.

Personal life
In 1956, his family moved to Taiwan during Battle of Dachen Archipelago. He married Sung Lai Wah and they have a son named Alan Ko, a daughter named Jennifer Ko, and another son named Jacky Ko. In 1997, Ko drove a car over the Hukou Waterfall on the Yellow River in Shaanxi Province to celebrate the handover of Hong Kong.

Death
On December 9, 2003, Ko died of blood poisoning in Shanghai. He was 50 years old.

Filmography

Actor
 Brothers (2004)
 PaPa Loves You (2004) 
 Life Express (2004)
 Black Mask 2: City of Masks (2002)
 Hero of City (2001) 
 City of Desire (2001) 
 For Bad Boys Only (2000)
 Born to Be King (2000) 
 Her Name Is Cat 2: Journey to Death (2000) 
 The Legend of Speed (1999)
 The Masked Prosecutor (1999) 
 Crying Heart (1999) 
 Cop Abula (1999)
 Full Alert (1997)
 Rainy Dog (1997)
 Black Rose II (1997)
 Best of the Best (1996)
 Young and Dangerous 3 (1996)
 Young and Dangerous 2 (1996)
 Mahjong Dragon (1996)
 Don't Give a Damn (1995)
 Jet Li's The Enforcer (1995)
 Thunderbolt (1995)
 Asian Connection (1995)
 Gao nu yi zu (1995)
 God of Gamblers III: Back to Shanghai (1994)
 Chez 'n Ham (1993)
 Crime Story (1993)
 Invincible (1992) 
 Fight Back to School II (1992)
 Rhythm of Destiny (1992) 
 Alan and Eric Between Hello and Goodbye (1991)
 God of Gamblers II (1991)
 Curry and Pepper (1990)
 It Takes Two to Mingle (1990)
 Burning Sensation (1989)
 Runaway Blues (1989)
 Code of Fortune (1989)
 Hero of Tomorrow (1988)
 The Dragon Family (1988)
 The Legend of Wisely (1987)
 The Final Test (1987)
 Rosa (1986)
 In the Line of Duty (1986)
 Heart of the Dragon (1985)
 Wheels on Meals (1984)
 Pink Force Commando (1982)
 Return of the Tiger (1979) 
 Silver Hermit from Shaolin Temple (1979) 
 Boxer's Adventure (1979)
 The Criminal (1977) 
 General Stone (1976) 
 Return of the Chinese Boxer (1975) 
 The Girl Named Iron Phoenix (1973) 
 Kung Fu Powerhouse (1973)
 Gold Snatchers (1973) 
 The Chinese Mechanic (1973) 
 The Gallant (1972) 
 One Armed Boxer (1971)
 The Mighty One (1971) 
 Song of Orchid Island (1965)

Director
 Life Express (2004) 
 Chez 'n Ham (1993) 
 Hero – Beyond the Boundary of Time (1993) 
 Invincible (1992) 
 The Days of Being Dumb (1992) 
 Curry and Pepper (1990) 
 Whampoa Blues (1990)

Stuntman, stunt arranger, stunt designer or stunt coordinator
 The Trail (1993, stunt arranger, stunt coordinator) 
 Dragon from Russia (1990, stunt coordinator) 
 Curry and Pepper (1990, stunt designer) 
 Dynamite Fighters (1987, car stunt) 
 In the Line of Duty (1986, stunt coordinator) 
 Yes, Madam (1985, car stunt)

Action director
 12 Hours of Terror (1991)
 The Legend of Wisely (1987) 
 Dragon of the Swords Man (1978)

Producer
 Girls in the Hood (1995)
 Chez 'n Ham (1993)

References

External links
 

1953 births
2003 deaths
Taiwanese stunt performers
Taiwanese male film actors
Taiwanese film directors
Taiwanese film producers
Artists from Ningbo
Film directors from Zhejiang
Actors from Ningbo
Chinese film directors
Taiwanese people from Zhejiang